Istin may refer to:
Istin, Razavi Khorasan
Istin, South Khorasan
A proprietary name for amlodipine